Best Christmas Ever is a seasonal program block on AMC, an American cable and satellite network. The block, launched in 2018, airs Christmas-themed television specials and feature films from late November until the day after Christmas.

Its primary direct competition is the more established 25 Days of Christmas on Freeform, on which much of the same programming had previously aired prior to 2018. The two blocks continue to share rights to three films, with each network getting a window to air each film: the 1994 remake of Miracle on 34th Street, Mrs. Doubtfire and Love the Coopers. In contrast to 25 Days of Christmas, Best Christmas Ever airs no original programming, relying entirely on reruns.

History
AMC had typically aired a rotating lineup of five to six Christmas movies during the holiday season. In 2018, the channel introduced a more extensive holiday lineup branded as Best Christmas Ever, running from November 26 to December 25, featuring a mix of popular Christmas and family films, along with other acquired specials. The schedule included notable acquisitions from Warner Bros., including Elf, National Lampoon's Christmas Vacation, The Polar Express, and 12 Rankin/Bass specials. The films had been recent mainstays of the 25 Days of Christmas schedule, with Elf in particular having received extensive airplay and high viewership during the event. Other programs included specials from DreamWorks Animation. As expected, AMC saw ratings gains over the holiday season; primetime viewership for the first two weeks of the event was up 40% year-over-year, airings of Elf and Christmas Vacation both peaked at 1.5 million viewers, and average viewership of feature films on Freeform fell by 36% year-over-year in the same period.

In 2019, Freeform responded to the loss of most of the Rankin/Bass library by acquiring cable rights to the two remaining specials from that company that had never been aired on cable: Rudolph the Red-Nosed Reindeer and Frosty the Snowman, sharing the rights with those two specials' longtime free-to-air rightsholder, CBS.

In 2020, AMC expanded the "Best Christmas Ever" brand to its streaming service AMC+, which carries more adult-oriented content from AMC and partner networks We TV, Sundance TV, IFC and BBC America.

For 2021, AMC added hosting segments from Beverly D'Angelo, the co-star of National Lampoon's Christmas Vacation, and themed days throughout the block, some of which will include out-of-season films: movie marathons devoted to John Candy and Bill Murray, marathons devoted to holiday mischief ("Naughty List Marathon") and slapstick ("Holiday Hijinks"), and a Wonka Weekend featuring a rotation of both film adaptations of the book Charlie and the Chocolate Factory.

Programming
As of 2022:

Specials
Donkey's Caroling Christmas-tacular
The First Christmas: The Story of the First Christmas Snow
Frosty's Winter Wonderland
Grandma Got Run Over by a Reindeer
How Murray Saved Christmas
Ice Age: A Mammoth Christmas
Jack Frost (1979)
The Leprechaun's Christmas Gold
The Life and Adventures of Santa Claus (1985)
The Little Drummer Boy Book II
The Madagascar Penguins in a Christmas Caper
Merry Madagascar
Michael Bublé's Christmas in Hollywood
Nestor, the Long-Eared Christmas Donkey
Pinocchio's Christmas
Rudolph's Shiny New Year
'Twas the Night Before Christmas (1974)
The Year Without a Santa Claus (Shared with Freeform TBS, and TNT as of 2022)

Series
The Great Christmas Light Fight (shared with CMT and Buzzr)

Films
Annie
Christmas with the Kranks (Shared with Freeform as of 2022.)
Elf (Shared with Freeform and TBS and TNT as of 2022)
Fred Claus (Shared with Freeform, TBS and TNT as of 2021)
Four Christmases (Shared with Freeform, TBS and TNT as of 2021)
Home Alone (Shared with Freeform)
Home Alone 2: Lost in New York (Shared with Freeform)
Ice Age
Ice Age: The Meltdown
Ice Age: Dawn of the Dinosaurs
Ice Age: Continental Drift
Jingle All the Way (Shared with Freeform)
Jack Frost (1998)
The Legend of Frosty the Snowman
Miracle on 34th Street (1947) (shared with TCM as of 2022)
National Lampoon's Christmas Vacation (shared with Freeform TBS and TNT  as of 2021)
Planes, Trains and Automobiles
The Polar Express (shared with Freeform, and TBS and TNT as of 2021)
Rudolph and Frosty's Christmas in July
Unaccompanied Minors
White Christmas

References

External links
Best Christmas Ever 2019 list

AMC (TV channel) original programming
Christmas television specials
Annual television shows
Television programming blocks in the United States
Recurring events established in 2018
2018 American television series debuts
AMC Networks